The 2019–20 Ball State Cardinals women's basketball team represented Ball State University during the 2019–20 NCAA Division I women's basketball season. The Cardinals, led by eighth year head coach Brady Sallee, played their home games at Worthen Arena as members of the West Division of the Mid-American Conference.

Roster

Schedule

|-
!colspan=9 style=| Non-conference regular season

|-

|-

|-

|-

|-

|-

|-

|-

|-

|-

|-

|-
!colspan=9 style=| MAC regular season

|-

|-

|-

|-

|-

|-

|-

|-

|-

|-

|-

|-

|-

|-

|-

|-

|-

|-
!colspan=9 style=| MAC Women's Tournament

Rankings
2019–20 NCAA Division I women's basketball rankings

See also
 2019–20 Ball State Cardinals men's basketball team

References

Ball State
Ball State Cardinals women's basketball seasons
Ball State
Ball State